The Big 12/SEC Challenge was an NCAA Division I men's college basketball series that took place in the middle of the season, usually late January, consisting of a series of ten games featuring members of the Big 12 Conference and Southeastern Conference.

The format was similar to the ACC–Big Ten Challenge. Each of the ten members of the Big 12 played a game against a member of the SEC. Half of the ten games were hosted by the Big 12 team and the other half were hosted by the SEC team. Because the SEC had 14 members, four teams of the SEC were excluded from the challenge each season. Effective with the 2019–20 season, the SEC teams excluded from the Big 12/SEC Challenge participated in the newly launched SEC/American Alliance against teams from the American Athletic Conference.

Previously, the Big 12 was a part of the Big 12/Pac-10 Hardwood Series from 2007 to 2010, and the SEC was a part of the SEC–Big East Challenge from 2007 to 2012. The contracts for those challenges were not renewed when they expired, leaving both conferences available to establish this challenge. (The issues faced by the Big East in the 2010–13 Big East Conference realignment was a factor in the decision not to renew its series with the SEC).

Two current SEC members, Texas A&M and Missouri, are former members of the Big 12. Missouri has a rivalry with current Big 12 member Kansas leaving the possibility of playing the rivalry game in the Big 12/SEC Challenge. The two teams had not met in the regular season since Missouri left for the SEC until December 10, 2022, when it was played outside of the Challenge.

In November 2022, it was reported that ESPN had decided to end the Big 12/SEC Challenge following the 2022–23 season after a 10-year run. In its place, ESPN is planning to hold an ACC/SEC Challenge during the week after Thanksgiving for both men's and women's college basketball.

Series history

Overall record

2013–14

2014–15

2015–16

2016–17

2017–18

2018–19

2019–20

2020–21

2021–22

2022–23

Team records

Big 12 Conference (5–3–2) 

Because the conferences do not have the same number of members (SEC has 14, Big 12 has 10) four teams from the SEC are excluded from participation each year. In all but one year all Big 12 teams played in the Challenge. Texas was scheduled to play in 2021 against Kentucky, but it was cancelled due to the COVID-19 pandemic.

Southeastern Conference (3–5–2) 

Because the conferences do not have the same number of members (SEC has 14, Big 12 has 10) four teams from the SEC are excluded from participation each year. The number of times an SEC team is excluded is shown in the "DNP" column in the table above. Kentucky was scheduled to play in 2021 against Texas, but it was cancelled due to the COVID-19 pandemic.

See also
 ACC–Big Ten Challenge
 Big 12/SEC Women's Challenge
 Big East–Big 12 Battle

References 

College men's basketball competitions in the United States
College basketball competitions
Big 12 Conference men's basketball
Southeastern Conference men's basketball
Recurring sporting events established in 2013